Suzanne Giraud (born 31 July 1958) is a French music educator and composer of contemporary music.

Biography

Suzanne Giraud was born in Metz and grew up in Strasbourg, where she began to study music for piano, violin, viola and music theory before entering the Paris Conservatoire. There she studied harmony, counterpoint, composition, analysis, orchestration and conducting. She studied composition in Paris with Claude Ballif, Dufourt Hughes and Tristan Murail, then at the Accademia Chigiana of Siena with Franco Donatoni.  She took summer courses in Darmstadt with Brian Ferneyhough. She studied for two years at the Villa Medici from 1984 to 1986.

Suzanne Giraud taught for two years at the Paris Conservatory. In 2007 and 2008, she was composer in residence at the Conservatory of Geneva, and worked with the Orchestre d'Auvergne.

Works

Suzanne Giraud's works have received prizes and awards including the Prix Georges Enesco, the SACEM, Prix Georges Bizet, the Academy of Fine Arts, selected the UNESCO International Rostrum of two selections of the ISCM (Budapest in 1986 and Manchester 1998). She writes for strings, percussion and orchestra.

Her works are often inspired by poetry, painting or architecture.  Selected examples include:

Offering to Venus, from a painting by Titian
Jaffa, a painting by Antoine-Jean Gros
To One in Paradise, a Poe poem
What you see in the world? according to Mellin de Saint-Gelais 
Petrarca, a collection of madrigals on Petrarch's sonnets
Music comes from elsewhere, from The Lord of the Rings by J. R. R. Tolkien
The Red Depths, uses electronics to represent the appearance of colors in underwater environments
Blue Shadow, a vision related to a poem written by Suzanne Giraud
Enchantments IV
Enchantments V reflects the architecture of San Gallo and Bramante.
The Fragrance Vase with Olivier Py (opera 2003)
Concerto for cello and orchestra, performed on tour by Anne Gastinel
Enchantments VII for voice and six instruments
Enchantments VIII for cello octet (Rencontres de Beauvais)
Monkey (children's opera)
Sea Ice and Mobile Phone (Theatre Beauvais)
Fables, for narrator, children's choir and orchestra
Promenade du soir for viola and piano (1987)
Élaboration for viola and piano (2000)

References

External links
Official website

1958 births
French music educators
Women classical composers
Living people
Women music educators